Michael Schofield may refer to:

 Michael Schofield (American football) (born 1990), American football player
 Michael Schofield (lacrosse), lacrosse player
 Michael Schofield (water polo), head coach for the water polo team of the United States Naval Academy
 Michael Schofield (campaigner) (1919–2014), British pioneer of social research into homosexuality
 Mike Schofield (born 1964), American lawyer and politician

See also
 Michael Scofield, a character on the American television series Prison Break